Naomi Raine Solomon (born April 9, 1987) is an American Christian and gospel singer, songwriter, and worship leader. Raine is a member of Maverick City Music collective.

Career 
Raine made her debut with Maverick City Music in 2019, releasing two projects that year. , they had released an additional 11 projects.

On July 8, 2022, Raine released her solo album “Journey” through TRIBL Records. “Journey” consists of 15 songs produced by Raine with G. Morris Coleman.

Awards and nominations

Billboard Music Awards

!Ref.
|-
| 2022
| "Jireh" 
| Top Gospel Song
| 
| 
|-
|}

GMA Dove Awards 

!Ref.
|-|-
| 2021
| "Jireh" 
| Worship Recorded Song of the Year
| 
| 
|-
| rowspan="2" | 2022
| rowspan="2" | "Jireh" 
| Song of the Year
| 
| rowspan="2" | 
|-
| Worship Recorded Song of the Year
| 
|-
|}

Grammy Awards

!
|-
| rowspan="4" | 2022
| "Wait on You"
| Best Gospel Performance/Song
| 
| rowspan="4" | 
|-
| Jubilee: Juneteenth Edition
| Best Gospel Album
| 
|-
| "Jireh"
| Best Contemporary Christian Music Performance/Song
| 
|-
| Old Church Basement
| Best Contemporary Christian Music Album
| 
|-
| rowspan="5" | 2023
| "Kingdom"
| Best Gospel Performance/Song
| 
| rowspan="5" | 
|-
| Kingdom Book One
| Best Gospel Album
| 
|-
| "God Really Loves Us (Radio Version)"
| rowspan="2" | Best Contemporary Christian Music Performance/Song
| 
|-
| "Fear Is Not My Future"
| 
|-
| Breathe
| Best Contemporary Christian Music Album
| 
|-
|}

See also 
 List of Christian worship music artists

Notes

References

External links
 

1987 births
Living people
American women singer-songwriters
Musicians from New York City
African-American Christians
American performers of Christian music
American gospel singers
Composers of Christian music